Lutimaribacter saemankumensis is a Gram-negative, rod-shaped and non-motile bacterium from the genus of Lutimaribacter which has been isolated from tidal flat sediments from the Yellow Sea from Korea.

References 

Rhodobacteraceae
Bacteria described in 2009